Team Yankee is a techno-thriller novel written in 1987 by  Harold Coyle, then a major in the United States Army, whose subject is the actions of a company-sized armor unit of the United States Army in the World War III scenario as depicted by General Sir John Hackett in his novel, The Third World War: The Untold Story.  General Hackett's scenario takes place in 1985; Coyle never specifies the year, but it is assumed to take place in the late 1980s. While Hackett's book emphasizes strategy and world politics, Coyle's features the experiences of the tank crews and infantrymen fighting on the front lines.

The novel achieved best-selling status and became a series of comic books, an Origins Award–winning board wargame and later a video game.  In 2015, it was adapted as a sister scenario for the Flames of War wargame.

Plot summary
The novel is set in West Germany and East Germany in the months of August and September; the year is unspecified.

Team Yankee ("Y" in the ICAO and NATO phonetic alphabet) is an armor-heavy company-sized unit (a "Team" in Army parlance). There is nothing special about this team; it is an average company-sized U.S. unit in an average battalion of the Regular Army.

Team Yankee is composed of First Platoon (Lieutenant Murray Weiss), Second Platoon (Second Lieutenant McAllister), Mech(anized Infantry) Platoon (Staff Sergeant Polgar), and Third Platoon (Second Lieutenant Gerry Garger). Captain Sean Bannon is company commander; First Lieutenant Robert Uleski is the executive officer; and company first sergeant is First Sergeant Raymond Harrert.

Captain Bannon is 27 years old, married and has three children. He studied military history, with a graduate degree, but is seen as an average officer; Coyle notes in the preface that Bannon will probably never rise in rank above lieutenant colonel.

The team has four M1 Abrams tanks per platoon numbered 11, 12, 13, 14, 21... to 34, with the first digit corresponding to the respective platoon. The XO's tank is numbered 55; the CO's tank 66. Thus, the team has 10 M1s in the first twelve chapters when its First Platoon is attached to another unit.

The team also has five M113 armored personnel carriers, and two M901 ITV TOW missile vehicles. The infantry is armed with Dragon antitank missiles and 66-millimeter LAWs. The Team also has a M113 AMEV (Armored Medical Evacuation Vehicle) and an M88 recovery vehicle.

The parent unit of Team Yankee is the First Battalion, 4th Armor. During the first twelve chapters it is attached to Task Force 3-78 Mechanized Infantry, commanded by Lieutenant Colonel Reynolds.  The brigade commander is Colonel Brunn.

The task force is composed of Team Yankee, C Company (Captain Craven), a standard infantry company, D Company, and another mech-heavy (one tank, two mech platoons) team, Team Bravo. In addition, there is an artillery support team (a FIST) (Second Lieutenant Rodney Unger) attached.

Prologue
The prologue begins with a series of quotations from international news sources listing the deteriorating international situation between the United States and the Soviet Union, particularly in the Persian Gulf, from July 15 to August 1, when NATO forces are mobilized and moved to the inter-German frontier.

Chapter 1: Stand-To

(August 3, early morning)

The novel begins with Team Yankee deployed forward towards the frontier with the German Democratic Republic. Captain Bannon is awakened by a radio check from his Third Platoon Leader, Lieutenant Garger—the third straight day Garger has used his radio to break radio silence. Unable to go back to sleep, Bannon inspects his unit and meets the other principal characters of the novel. He finds Garger, berates him, and decides that with a war coming on, Garger would need to be replaced as a liability.

Meanwhile, at the Army base, Pat Bannon, Sean's wife, understands that the possibility of war is high, and prepares to evacuate her small children while exercising the informal leadership over the other Army wives of Team Yankee.

Chapter 2: First Battle

(August 3, 0730 hours)

Colonel Reynolds inspects the forward positions of his task force, including Team Yankee, when the war starts. The Soviets push through the armored cavalry screen and attack the team, in dug in positions under cover. Team Bravo's company commander is killed in combat. Team Yankee repels the Soviet attack. To Captain Bannon's pleasant surprise, his problem lieutenant is proving to be quite competent in combat.

At the base, Pat serves as the informal head of Team Yankee's dependents. She makes a trip into the nearest town to make sure Sue Garger, Gerry's wife, is recovered. The roads are choked with military and refugee traffic.

Chapter 3: Change of Mission

(August 3, late afternoon/evening)

Pat Bannon, her children, and all the other dependents make it to Rhein-Main Air Base, where they await evacuation. As soon as an aircraft lands and offloads U.S. reinforcements, dependents are loaded on the plane. A Soviet air strike occurs while the dependents wait; Pat and her children must run past dead civilians to make the flight.

Meanwhile, the task force and the Team recover from the first firefight. Bannon finds that the attitude of those who have actually seen combat differs from the staff, who are more enthusiastic about the war.

Chapter 4: Into the Vacuum

(August 4, morning)

Team Yankee is ordered to attack Hill 214 with C Company in support. There is confusion in orders; Major Jordan, the battalion S-3, orders the attack be halted, while Colonel Reynolds, the battalion commander, orders Bannon to attack. 2LT McAllister, in Tank 21, is killed during the attack.

Chapter 5: Hunter and Hunted

(August 4, daytime)

In the fighting, Bannon's tank, 66, is crippled and his driver is killed. The surviving three crewmen in 66 defeat three T-62 tanks, which did not suspect 66 was still in action; the crew destroys 66 to prevent its capture. Bannon rejoins the Team and takes over Lt. Uleski's tank 55. C Company never arrives and the Team is forced to fight to hold Hill 214 on its own.

Chapter 6: On The Razor's Edge

(August 4/5)

Team Yankee holds off an attack by a Soviet battalion on Hill 214 during the night. Bannon's loader, PFC Richard Kelp, and Private McCauley volunteer to lead a Dragon gunner to engage the enemy on foot. The Dragon gunner is killed and Kelp and McCauley race against time to destroy a T-72 before it destroys them. Kelp is later awarded a Silver Star for his efforts.

Chapter 7: Check and Checkmate

(August 5, 0530 hours)

The Team was scheduled to withdraw at 0330 to U.S. lines, but every man in the company, fatigued from the fighting, falls asleep. Bannon wakes up two hours later, wakes up his tank crew and platoon leaders to the universal chorus. Bannon works out a way that the Team can withdraw in daylight with minimal casualties.

Chapter 8: R and R

The Team reaches the nearest town, where, to his fury, Bannon finds soldiers from C Company lounging around.  Bannon reports to the task force commander; the Team is placed in reserve, where it can recover and receive reinforcements. 2nd Lt. Avery, an Armor School classmate of 2nd Lt Garger's, reports as Lt McAllister's replacement. Avery is puzzled by the slightly distant reception he gets from the Team's officers, including Garger.

Chapter 9: Deep Attack

(August 8 to 11)

Lt. Avery, who has yet to enter combat, finds himself isolated from the other members of the Team. He finds himself even more isolated when the Team starts to paint kill rings on the barrels of each tank.

The brigade to which Team Yankee belongs is ordered to follow up a West German counterattack into East Germany though the Thuringer Wald towards Leipzig and Berlin to cut off the Soviet offensive against the Northern Army Group. Because of the Team's combat experience, Bannon is ordered to lead the attack. Bannon expresses doubts to Colonel Reynolds that the rest of the battalion, in particular C Company, can carry out their role in supporting the armor teams.

The attack is delayed because the enemy, a Polish T-55 tank battalion, launches its attack first, which gives the Team a chance to fight from defensive cover. The Poles fall back and the Task Force pursues. Avery gets his first kill.

Chapter 10: Red Dawn

(August 11, morning)

The Task Force attack stops to consolidate its gains; the Polish unit that was scattered by Team Yankee reforms and attacks C Company. The Task Force, assisted by a German company, moves to support Captain Cravin's company. In the fight, the battalion XO is hit and taken out of action. D Company, Team Bravo, and the German unit, assisted by U.S. artillery, crush the Polish battalion.

The Task Force halts to reorganize. Bannon sends the Mech Platoon to secure the nearest town. An East German teenager, apparently a member of the Free German Youth, wounds one of Polgar's infantrymen with an AK-47 rifle and is killed immediately.

Chapter 11: Counterattack
Lt. Avery, in Tank 21, is wounded in an air attack by a Soviet helicopter. First Sergeant Harrert and the maintenance crew salvage the tank, grimly noting it would be back in combat in 24 hours.

The task force headquarters is attacked, severely wounding Colonel Reynolds and cutting off the XO, Major Jordan, from communicating with the Task Force; Bannon finds himself in command of the Task Force and leads three companies to defeat the Soviet counterattack and rescue the Task Force staff.

Chapter 12: "They Came in the Same Old Way"
The surviving Task Force staff, led by Major Jordan, resume command. C Company is effectively wiped out and its survivors are integrated with D Company. The Task Force plans to ambush a Soviet battalion heading westward into their position, centered on an East German town. Jordan plans a reverse slope defense, not attacking the Soviets at the logical choke point. The Soviet attackers, harassed by the Task Force scout platoon and U.S. artillery-delivered mines, fail to take the town or the hills to the north of the valley. The Soviet commander moves south, into Bannon's Team's guns.

When asked to give his after-action report, Bannon flippantly quotes the Duke of Wellington: "They came, you know, in the same old way and we beat them in the same old way".

Chapter 13: To the Saale
NATO as a whole, and the U.S. in particular, is running short of equipment and manpower. Units that are no longer capable of going on the offensive, or are not holding key terrain, are stripped of their most effective units. Team Yankee is thus moved from Task Force 3-78 to Task Force 1-4 Armored, which is their parent battalion, to continue the attack into Leipzig and Berlin.

The Team is assigned a screening role to the main effort, and is ordered to feint as if they intend to capture a bridge over the Saale River. However, due to speed of their attack and a divided command between the Soviet Army and the KGB, Lt. Weiss' platoon is able to capture the bridge intact.

Chapter 14: The Day After
The next day, Bannon finds out that the Soviets have launched a nuclear attack on the city of Birmingham, England; NATO retaliates by destroying the city of Minsk, Belarus. The Task Force is ordered to prepare for nuclear warfare (by dispersion, deeper cover, and protection against the effects of a blast on electronics and optics). Bannon immediately orders a tightening on hygiene and equipment maintenance to lessen the long-term effects of nuclear war.

Bannon prepares for the next attack when the news comes that a cease-fire was declared and the war is over.

Epilogue
The cease-fire holds. Life slowly resumes a routine closer to peacetime. A National Guard division relieves Bannon's division, and Bannon returns to his quarters only two months after he left, to reconnect with his family life.

Major themes
The novel has as a theme the actions of a company-sized armor unit of the United States Army in the World War III scenario as depicted by General Sir John Hackett in his novel, The Third World War.  It also deals with, to a lesser degree, the reactions of men facing combat for the first time, and how they react after seeing combat.

The novel also refers to "Company Commander", the WW2 infantry service memoir by Charles B. Macdonald... a recollection of Macdonald's service as an infantry officer.

Non-fiction books describing similar experiences to those of the fictional Team Yankee are "Brazen Chariots" by Robert Crisp, which describes his service in the North African armored campaigns in the Second World War, and "Heights of Courage" by Avigdor Kahalani, an account of his experiences in the 1973 Yom Kippur War.

Significance
Team Yankee was Coyle's first novel, and its success made Coyle a prominent writer in the field of military fiction.

Other adaptations

Board games
 GDW Games published Team Yankee under license, authored by Frank Chadwick and Marc W. Miller, as a part of their "First Battle" series of wargames that shared the same basic rules. In the March 1989 edition of Games International (issue #3), Ellis Simpson reviewed the game and was not impressed, giving it a very poor rating of only 1 out of 5 and saying: "I hesitate to criticise two designers who are far more qualified than me. However, in my humble opinion this game is a turkey".
 While not directly based on the novel, the game World at War: Eisenbach Gap by Mark H. Walker is based on events and units as laid out in the Team Yankee book and John Hackett's book The Third World War.

Comic book
First Comics published a six-issue comic book series based on Team Yankee, which was reissued as a graphic novel in 1989. David Drake wrote the strip.

Video game

Table-top game
In November 2015, the gaming system Flames of War, released the miniature based table-top game "Team Yankee", inspired by both "The Third World War" and "Team Yankee" novels. It allows the player to build a Team Yankee, NATO, or Warsaw Pact force to play with. It also has missions based on missions in the novel.

References

1987 American novels
Novels set during World War III
Novels set in Germany
American thriller novels
American war novels
Techno-thriller novels